The canton of Arbois is an administrative division of the Jura department, eastern France. Its borders were modified at the French canton reorganisation which came into effect in March 2015. Its seat is in Arbois.

It consists of the following communes:
 
Abergement-le-Grand
Abergement-lès-Thésy
Aiglepierre
Arbois
Aresches
Les Arsures
Bracon
Cernans
La Chapelle-sur-Furieuse
La Châtelaine
Chaux-Champagny
Chilly-sur-Salins
Clucy
Dournon
La Ferté
Geraise
Ivory
Ivrey
Lemuy
Marnoz
Mathenay
Mesnay
Molamboz
Montigny-lès-Arsures
Montmarlon
Les Planches-près-Arbois
Pont-d'Héry
Pretin
Pupillin
Saint-Cyr-Montmalin
Saint-Thiébaud
Saizenay
Salins-les-Bains
Thésy
Vadans
Villette-lès-Arbois

References

Cantons of Jura (department)